The following is a list of players, both past and current, who appeared at least in one game for the San Miguel Beermen PBA franchise.



A

B

C

D

E

F

G

H

I

J

K

L

M

N

O

P

Q

R

S

T

U

V

W

Y

Z

References